Christian College of Nursing is a South Korean technical college specialized in training for the nursing profession. The campus is located in the country's southwest, in the metropolitan city of Gwangju. The current president is Myeung-sook Koh. It enrolls about 360 students and is affiliated with the Gwangju Christian Hospital.

Academics

All of the college's academic offerings are related to nursing.

History

The college first opened its doors in 1967 as Supia Nursing School (수피아간호학교) with an entering class of 40 students. The college took its present name in 1998.

See also
List of colleges and universities in South Korea
Education in South Korea

External links 
 Official school website, in Korean

Nursing schools in South Korea
Universities and colleges in Gwangju
Nam District, Gwangju
Educational institutions established in 1967
1967 establishments in South Korea